Fabio D'Elia (born 19 January 1983) is a retired half-Italian Liechtenstein football midfielder. He also played for the Liechtenstein national football team and won 50 caps and scored two goals since his debut against Austria in a World Cup qualifier in April 2001.

International goals

References

External links
Liechtenstein FA profile

Living people
Liechtenstein footballers
Liechtenstein international footballers
Swiss men's footballers
Liechtenstein people of Italian descent
Liechtenstein people of Swiss descent
Swiss people of Italian descent
1983 births
FC Vaduz players
FC Chur 97 players
USV Eschen/Mauren players
Association football defenders